Kyros or Cyrus (died 8 January 712) was the Ecumenical Patriarch of Constantinople from 705 to 712. He is regarded as a saint in the Eastern Orthodox Church and Roman Catholic Church, which had set his feast for January 7 in Roman Catholic Church and January 8 (21) in Orthodox Church. Cyrus was placed on the patriarchal throne in 705 by Emperor Justinian II, as a replacement for the deposed Patriarch Callinicus I. Soon after Justinian's decline and eventual fall in December 711, Kyros was replaced by the new Emperor Philippicus with Patriarch John VI, who shared Philippicus' Monothelite sympathies.

See also
Eastern Orthodoxy

Notes

References
The Oxford Dictionary of Byzantium, Oxford University Press, 1991.

External links
 Santiebeati:Kyros of Constantinople

Saints from Constantinople
8th-century patriarchs of Constantinople
8th-century Christian saints
Twenty Years' Anarchy